Home safety is the awareness of risks and potential dangers in and around a home which may cause bodily harm, injury, or even death to those living there.

Most common risks

Mold
Molds are microscopic organisms that thrive in damp environments. They can be found on tiles and fabric, in bathrooms and kitchens, and nearly any damp, warm place. Molds are usually not a problem indoors unless mold spores land on a wet or damp spot and begin growing. Allergic reactions to molds are common and include high fever-type symptoms, such as sneezing, runny nose, and red eyes.

Home safety practices 

Slip and trip – Falling accidents at home are very common and can cause serious and life-threatening injuries, so prevention of slip and trip accidents is essential in the good design of living quarters. This objective is especially important for the elderly and disabled, who may have restricted movement and be more susceptible to hazards. It includes adequate supports such as handrails and balustrades as well as ensuring walking surfaces are of high friction and thus slip resistant. Lighting is also vital for being bright enough to enable the user to see obstacles when walking into a room, for example. Users may also be provided with a walking stick or crutches to aid walking and personal support. Fall prevention is an active form of protection for users.

Radon testing and mitigation – The two types of radon gas testing devices are passive and active. A kit can be set up in the home or a professional can be hired to perform the test. If the test result comes back with high concentrations of radon, there are proven ways to reduce radon gas and bring it to acceptable levels.  One method uses a vent pipe system and fan, which pulls radon from beneath the house and vents it to the outside. This system, known as a soil suction radon reduction system, involves minor changes to your home.

Carbon monoxide detectors – Carbon monoxide (CO) detectors located in key areas inside the home is a preventative measure against CO poisoning.  The gas is created during incomplete combustion in central heating boilers, as well as in open fires. Chimneys to such devices can become blocked, allowing the gas to enter living spaces. The odorless gas is toxic even in small amounts, and thus is a serious hazard. For multi-level homes, it is recommended to have a minimum of one carbon monoxide detector per floor. For added protection, CO detector should be placed in each room and a utility/furnace room.

 Toxic mold – Preventative steps include drying water damage and moisture control in the home. Inhaling or touching mold or mold spores may cause allergic reactions in sensitive individuals.

Burns/Fire:

Family safety plans – Family safety plans are an essential tool in fire safety because the plan helps family members to identify a fire escape plan. A safety plan includes knowing two ways out of every room, a safe place for members to meet outside of a burning home, and essential emergency telephone numbers.  It is important to practice fire escape plans.

Sprinklers – Fire sprinklers offer a layer of protection because the sprinkler can respond to fire while it is still small. Fire sprinklers  respond only the sprinkler closest to the heat source. Smoke alone will not set a fire sprinkler to discharge.

Fire extinguishers – There are five different classes of fires; A, B, C, D, and K. Class A consists of burning paper, wood, cloth or other combustible solids.  Class B consists of liquids and gasses such as propane. Class C fires consist of electrical fires. While class D fires (which is less common) consists of burning metal and class K fires (the most common) consists of kitchen type materials, i.e., grease and oil.

Fire extinguishers use a variety of substances to put out fires; dry powder, dry chemical, water, halogenated, carbon and foam. Since different substances burn differently, fire extinguishers are labeled (and often color-coded) according to the type or class of fire they can extinguish. It is, therefore, necessary to choose the correct fire extinguisher for home use.

Fire alarms – Fire alarms monitors the environmental changes associated with combustion.  Once the alarm has been triggered by fire or smoke, a loud sound emanates to warn of danger and sends a message to a central monitoring center, which then notifies the local fire department.

Smoke alarms – Smoke alarms also known as smoke detectors, generally sound an audible and visual alarm. Smoke alarms are usually housed in a disk-shaped plastic enclosure about 6 inches in diameter and 1 inch thick and are often powered by a disposable battery.

 Heat detectors – Heat detectors are a device that responds to changes in ambient temperature. Heat detectors are not meant to replace smoke detectors. They are often placed in rooms where standard smoke detectors are not suitable, such as laundry rooms, garages, and attics.

Home fire escape plans – A fire escape plan with two exits from every room should be created, and practice drills conducted at least once every six months. When creating the fire escape plan, it is best to have a layout that shows each room and potential escape route in the home. The escape plan should be explained to children and care taken that they recognize the sound of the fire alarm and know to check the door for heat and how to stay low to the ground.

Poison – The number of the local Poison control center should be kept readily available.

Standards organizations

There are a number of organizations in the United States and other jurisdictions that release or maintain standards on the topic of home safety, including:

 Home Safety Council
 National Safety Council
 National Fire Safety Council
 Occupational Safety and Health Administration

See also
 Occupational safety

References

External links
 Home Safety Council
 National Safety Council
 National Fire Safety Council
 Occupational Safety and Health Administration

Home
Occupational safety and health